Vardaan Arora (born 22 April 1992) is an Indian recording artist, songwriter, and actor based in New York.

Early life 
Vardaan Arora was born in New Delhi, India. After attending The British School in New Delhi, he went on to study theatre at New York University's Tisch School of the Arts.

Career 
Vardaan Arora's introduction to the pop music scene happened with his debut single, "Feel Good Song", in 2016. The song, written by Arora himself, charted on Spotify's Viral 50. In 2018, following the release of his single What If, Arora was named one of Billboard's 12 LGBTQ Musicians to Discover During Pride Month alongside up and coming openly queer acts such as Jesse Saint John, Zolita, REYNA, and others. Arora most recently released singles "January" and "thirty under thirty" in 2019. He co-penned the tracks with songwriter Natalia Lalwani, who is also originally from India.

As an actor, Vardaan Arora was to appear on Netflix's psychological thriller Gypsy, starring Naomi Watts.

Arora has been an outspoken advocate for the LGBT community, and has also been open about his struggles with obsessive–compulsive disorder in order to gather more awareness about mental health issues.

In 2019, Arora was cast in the film Wrong Turn.

In August 2020, Arora released his debut EP, Heartbreak On The Dance Floor. Arora told Billboard, "I think I went into this industry pretty blindly, and because of that, I was still figuring out who I was as an artist for those four years...I'm aiming to make a big impact — I want to make a statement with this." Billboard wrote, "It's clear that Arora succeeded: the pure synth-pop he delivers on Heartbreak is some of his best yet, all packaged within the cohesive confines of a well-defined '80s aesthetic." The music video for the title track was featured in Rolling Stone who wrote, "Arora explores confidence, anxiety, sexiness, self-doubt and aims to portray that all these emotions can co-exist. Diving into glimmering pop that swivels every now and then, Arora has a handle on catchy pop that still places the most importance on emotive melodies."

Discography

Extended plays

Singles

References 

1992 births
Living people
21st-century Indian male singers
Indian male songwriters
21st-century Indian male actors
Male actors from New Delhi
Male actors from New York City
Singers from New York City
People with obsessive–compulsive disorder
American gay actors
Indian gay actors
Gay singers
Gay songwriters
Indian LGBT singers
Indian LGBT songwriters
Indian expatriates in the United States
Tisch School of the Arts alumni
20th-century Indian LGBT people
21st-century Indian LGBT people